The 1963 Cleveland Browns season was the team's 14th season with the National Football League.

Hall of Fame running back Jim Brown led the league in rushing for the 6th time in seven seasons. As a team, the 1963 Browns gained an NFL-record 5.74 yards per carry.

Exhibition schedule 

There was a doubleheader on August 17, 1963 Giants vs Lions and Colts vs Browns.

Regular season schedule

Playoffs

Standings

Personnel

Roster

Staff

Awards and honors 
 Jim Brown, Bert Bell Award

References

External links 
 1963 Cleveland Browns season at Profootballreference.com 
 1963 Cleveland Browns season statistics at jt-sw.com  
 1963 Cleveland Browns at DatabaseFootball.com  

Cleveland
Cleveland Browns seasons
Cleveland